Monte Terza Grande (2,586 m) is a mountain of the Carnic Alps in Belluno, Veneto in north-eastern Italy. It is the highest mountain of the Southern Carnics and is part of a small Dolomitic group known as the "Dolomiti Pesarine". It resembles a pyramid from the north and south and a rocky massif from the east or west, and boasts a northwest face that is one kilometre high. It was first climbed in 1820.

References

Mountains of the Alps
Mountains of Veneto